The Brest Congress was the eighteenth national congress of the French Socialist Party (Parti socialiste or PS). It took place from November 21 to 23, 1997.

Results

François Hollande was elected as First Secretary, defeating Jean-Luc Mélenchon.

References

Congresses of the Socialist Party (France)
François Hollande
1997 in France
1997 in politics
1997 conferences